The Accidental Couple (lit. Just Looking), shortened to That Fool, is a 2009 South Korean television series starring Hwang Jung-min and Kim Ah-joong. The romantic comedy series focuses on the relationship between a post office clerk and an actress after they agree to a six-month contract marriage. It aired on KBS2 from April 29 to June 18, 2009, on Wednesdays and Thursdays at 21:55 (KST) for 16 episodes.

The drama was acclaimed film and stage actor Hwang Jung-min's first TV drama in a career spanning over fourteen years.

Synopsis
Top actress Han Ji-soo (Kim Ah-joong) is in a car accident. The problem is that her secret boyfriend, who is the son of a famous politician, was driving the car. To cover up their relationship, Ji-soo lets her boyfriend escape the scene quickly and drags an innocent onlooker, Gu Dong-baek (Hwang Jung-min), into the car instead, asking him to pretend to have driven the car. The paparazzi arrive and take their photos. After this incident, Dong-baek, a post office employee, quickly draws public attention as the actress's new boyfriend. But one of the paparazzi photographers suspects that somebody else was driving the car when the accident occurred, and the man veiled in secrecy is her real boyfriend. To drive the persistent paparazzi away, Ji-soo asks Dong-baek to continue acting as her boyfriend. Dong-baek, an avid fan of Ji-soo, readily accepts her proposal and they agree to a six-month contract marriage. Before the contract period ends, however, the actress finds herself deeply attached to this humble man's pure love.

Cast
 Hwang Jung-min as Gu Dong-baek
Shin Ki-joon as young Dong-baek
 Kim Ah-joong as Han Ji-soo
Im Si-eun as young Ji-soo
 Joo Sang-wook as Kim Kang-mo (Ji-soo's secret boyfriend)
 Lee Chung-ah as Gu Min-ji (Dong-baek's younger sister)
Lee Jua as young Min-ji
 Baek Sung-hyun as Han Sang-chul (Ji-soo's younger brother)
Cha Jun-hwan as young Sang-chul
 Jeon Mi-seon as Cha Yun-kyung (Ji-soo's manager & best friend)
 Lee Soo-young as Jo Seung-eun (Min-ji's best friend)
 Yeon Mi-joo as Park Kyung-ae
 Hong Ji-young as Jo Myung-jin
 Moon Jae-won as Yoon-seob
 Kang Hee-soo as Tae-won
 Kim Hyung-gyu as Kim Suk-hyun
 Kim Kwang-kyu as Team leader Go at the post office
Yoon Joo-sang as Director Yoon
 Jung Dong-hwan as Kim Jung-wook (Kang-mo's father, a politician)
 Ryu Tae-ho as Assistant Kim (Jung-wook's secretary)
 Lee Hae-young as Reporter Baek
 Park Ha-sun as Choi Soo-yeon (Kang-mo's fiancée)
 Jo Sang-gun as President Choi (Soo-yeon's father)
 Hong Seok-cheon as movie director (cameo)
 Choi Yoon-young as stylist

Ratings 
In the tables below, the blue numbers represent the lowest ratings and the red numbers represent the highest ratings.

Awards and nominations

International broadcast
It aired in Thailand on Channel 7 every Thursday to Friday at 8.30 a.m. starting from February 14, 2013.

It aired in the Philippines on TV5 every Monday to Friday at 9.00 p.m. starting from January 25, 2016.

References

External links
  
 
 
 

Korean Broadcasting System television dramas
Korean-language television shows
2009 South Korean television series debuts
2009 South Korean television series endings
South Korean romantic comedy television series
Television series by RaemongRaein